Francine John-Calame (born April 30, 1954) is a Swiss politician from the Canton of Neuchâtel.  She was a member of the National Council and the parliament of the Canton of Neuchâtel from 1993 to 2002. She is a municipal councillor in Le Cerneux-Péquignot.

On the list of the Green Party, she acceded to the National Council on May 31, 2005 following the resignation of Fernand Cuche.

Francine John-Calame is married and mother of two.

External links

1954 births
Living people
Members of the National Council (Switzerland)
Women members of the National Council (Switzerland)
20th-century Swiss women politicians
20th-century Swiss politicians
21st-century Swiss women politicians
21st-century Swiss politicians